The Chester Mystery Plays is a cycle of mystery plays originating in the city of Chester, England and dating back to at least the early part of the 15th century.

Origins and history
Biblical dramas were being performed across continental Europe in Latin as early as the 10th century. Originally dramatizing the visit of the shepherds to the birth of new-born Christ. Later priests of the Benedictbeuren in Bavaria combined costumes and content from the Old Testament with their Christmas plays.

By the late 12th century biblical plays were performed outside of churches and were written in vernacular languages. They still emphasized incidents of the Old and New Testaments but were more dramatic and less orthodox. The 1150 AD performance titled The Play of Adam from Norman France dramatized the fall of Adam Eve in the garden of Eden 

The inclusion of drama was extremely popular among the French population and found similar popularity in England. In the 14th century a boom in vernacular Bible drama plays were performed across medieval England for three main reasons: the introduction of the institution of the Feast of Corpus Christi, the growing population of towns and subsequently municipal governments independent of feudal lords, and the development of trade guilds.  

The Feast of Corpus Christi began in 1264 by Pope Urban IV and was created to celebrate the real presence of Christ within the bread and wine of the Eucharist. The feast occurred on Trinity Sunday between the months of May and June and priests processed through the streets displaying the “Host” of Jesus which was a consecrated wafer encased within a casket containing the real presence of Christ in the world.

The urbanization of townships and interconnectedness of these communities resulted in populations becoming increasingly dependent on each other. Thus, the specialization of labour was enabled by such interconnectedness. There were trade guilds for bakers, tailors, and goldsmiths who trained apprentices and regulated wages and working conditions. These skilled labourers working with their local communities helped collectively build the stages and props for the performances. Subsequently, the staging of these dramatic performances became increasingly urban, bourgeois, and informed from continental Europe by constant trade crossing the channel into England. 

The “Host” would be accompanied by a tableau of biblical scenes which represented sacred Christian history which is the origins of the cycle plays known today. By 1394 plays based on biblical history of salvation were being performed in York, England. The usage of pageant wagons enabled performances to travel across the country to various communities across medieval England. The plays attracted people to the towns they were performed in and therefore communities such as York and Chester benefited from commercial trade from visitors.   

The Mystery plays were banned nationally in the 16th century. Chester was the last to concede in 1578 and so became the longest-running cycle in medieval times. Revived in 1951 for the Festival of Britain, they have since been staged every five years. 

Prior to the performance, the Crier (officer) read out these banns: "The Aldermen and stewards of every society and company draw yourselves to your said several companies according to Ancient Custom and so to appear with your said several Companies every man as you are Called upon pain that shall fall thereon". Such early banns exhorted each company to perform well.

Under Queen Elizabeth I, the plays were seen as 'Popery' and banned by the English Church. Despite this, a play cycle was performed in 1568 and the cathedral paid for the stage and beer as in 1562. They were performed in 1572 despite a protest by an Evangelical minister. They were performed again, over four days, in 1575. This resulted in the mayor, when he retired from his office, being taken to the Star Chamber in London to answer allegations against him, but with the support of the council/assembly he was freed.

One edition of the plays begins with "The Banes which are reade beefore the beginninge of the playes of Chester, 4 June 1600". Each play ends with "Finis. Deo gracias! per me Georgi Bellin. 1592".

The time of the original composition of the plays is disputed; a date as early as the mid 14th century has been suggested.

Modern revivals 

The plays were revived in Chester in 1951 as part of the Festival of Britain and are presented there every five years.

The Players of St Peter have been performing the plays in London roughly every five years since 1946.

Under the direction of Jeff Dailey, the American Theatre of Actors in New York City performed the penultimate play, The Coming of Antichrist, in August 2017.

Adaptations
In the twentieth century, the Noah's Flood play was set operatically by both Benjamin Britten (Noye's Fludde) and Igor Stravinsky (The Flood). The play regarded the relationship between wife and husband (urban life) and spoke about the physical and spiritual world that provides a backdrop of the play. 

The Mysteries is an adaption by the poet Tony Harrison, principally based upon the Wakefield Cycle, but incorporating scenes from the York, Chester and N-Town canons, first performed in 1977 at the National Theatre, and again revived in 2000 as a celebration of the millennium.

See also

Medieval theatre

References

External links
 The Official Chester Mystery Plays Website - the website of the Chester Mystery Cycle with news of the performance in June 2008.
 Chester Mystery Plays 2003 performance - free downloadable media clips from the Chester Mystery Cycle performance of 2003, featuring full mp3 audio track 'Christ Theme' and video excerpt from the performance.
 The original text

Further reading
 Sergi, Matthew. Practical Cues and Social Spectacle in the Chester Plays. University of Chicago Press: 2020. 
Gordon Emery - Curious Chester (2005) 
The Chester Mystery Cycle: A Facsimile of MS Bodley 175, introduction by R. M. Lumiansky and David Mills, Leeds Texts and Monographs Facsimiles, 1 (Leeds, 1973)
The Chester Mystery Cycle: A Reduced Facsimile of Huntington Library MS 2, edited by R. M. Lumiansky and David Mills, Leeds Texts and Monographs Facsimiles, 6 (1980)
The Chester Mystery Cycle: A Facsimile of British Library Harley MS 2124, edited by David Mills, Leeds Texts and Monographs Facsimiles, 8 (1984)
 Kazik, Joanna. “Of People and Places: Urban Gendering in the English Plays.” Studia Anglica Posnaniensia, vol. 45, no. 2, Versita, 2009, pp. 161–72,
 Kroll, Norma. “The Towneley and Chester Plays of the Shepherds: The Dynamic Interweaving of Power, Conflict, and Destiny.” Studies in Philology, vol. 100, no. 3, University of North Carolina Press, 2003, pp. 315–45, doi:10.1353/sip.2003.0014.

Middle English literature
Folk plays
English plays
15th-century plays
Festivals in Cheshire
Chester
Medieval drama
Christian plays